Péter Tóth (born 17 April 1989) is a retired professional football player who played as a midfielder.

Career

Professional
Tóth played with Hungarian sides Ujpest FC, Budapest Honvéd FC, Rákospalotai EAC and Zalaegerszegi TE between 2008 and 2013, before moving to the United States to join USL side Oklahoma City Energy.

References

1989 births
Living people
Hungarian footballers
OKC Energy FC players
Association football forwards
USL Championship players
Expatriate soccer players in the United States
Hungarian expatriate footballers
Footballers from Budapest